Happy Valley may refer to:

 Happy Valley, Queensland (Fraser Island), a town on Fraser Island,
 Happy Valley, Queensland (Mount Isa), a suburb in Mount Isa